Felix Gottfried Wehling (4 May 1862 – 19 January 1913) was a German architect.

Life 

Born in Barby, Wehling - who had moved from Cologne - was registered in Düsseldorf from 1886. He was married to Guiseppine Borghetti (1857-1929) from Locarno and had six children with his wife. His daughter Angelika Elisabeth (1893-1945) married the eau-de-Cologne manufacturer Johann Maria Carl Farina in 1921.

In Düsseldorf, he was involved in the city's "real boom period between 1900 and 1914". and worked for a time in various working groups and law firms, such as "Jacobs and Wehling" (with Hubert Jacobs) and "Wehling und Ludwig" (with Alois Ludwig).

Wehling died in Düsseldorf at the age of 50.

Buildings and designs

1886–1896 (in Büro Jacobs & Wehling) 

In 1886/1887, Wehling built various houses in Cologne together with Hubert Jacobs. From 1888 onwards, the work of Wehling and Jacobs is documented in Düsseldorf, where they worked together until 1896. The office of Jacobs and Wehling is documented in the 1890, 1891 and 1892 editions of the Adressbuch der Oberbürgermeisterei Düsseldorf.

 1886/1887: Haus Luxemburger Straße 34 in Cologne (Jacobs & Wehling).
 1886/1887: Haus Von-Werth-Straße 59 / Hansaring 20 in Cologne (Jacobs & Wehling) (abandoned in 1972).
 1888: Haus Grabenstraße 4 für die Firma Gebr. Mangold in Düsseldorf (Jacobs & Wehling).
 1889: Wettbewerbsentwurf für ein Kaiser-Wilhelm-Denkmal am Drachenfels (Jacobs & Wehling) (1st prize, not implemented).
 1890: Haus Breite Straße 8 for the Düsseldorfer Allgemeine Versicherungsgesellschaft für See-, Fluss- und Landtransport in Düsseldorf (Jacobs & Wehling).
 1891: Haus Bismarckstraße 106 in Düsseldorf (Jacobs & Wehling).
 1892: Haus Kaiser-Wilhelm-Straße 1, Ecke Oststraße in Düsseldorf (Jacobs & Wehling).
 1892: Haus Kaiser-Wilhelm-Straße 55 in Düsseldorf (Jacobs & Wehling).
The designs were created by "Gottfr. Wehling in close consultation with the builder".
 1895: Haus Elisabethstraße 11 in Düsseldorf.
 1895–1896: , Friedrichstraße / Adersstraße, 1,860 m² built-up area, in the style of "modernised renaissance forms" (Jacobs & Wehling).
 1896: , Bolkerstraße 19–21 in Düsseldorf (Jacobs & Wehling). Other works included the creation of remarkable intérieurs in Düsseldorf:
 Haus Alleestraße 42.
 House .

1897/1898 (Gottfried Wehling, Düsseldorf) 
From 1897 to 1898, the architect Gottfried Wehling built the  Alleestraße 30 in Düsseldorf with "modernising Renaissance forms [and] remarkable naturalistic ornamentation". In 1898, the "architect Gottfried Wehling" rebuilt the façade of the commercial building of the company C. Fausel,  in Düsseldorf.

1900–1903 (Wehling & Ludwig) 
From 1900 onwards, Gottfried Wehling and  collaborated in Düsseldorf, where they worked together until 1903.

 1900: Conversion and extension of the commercial building  of the company Gebrüder Mangold in Düsseldorf, "magnificent example of a modern poster house" (Wehling & Ludwig).
 1900: Geschäftshaus Schadowstraße 52 for the photographer Thomas Lantin (Wehling & Ludwig).
 1901/1902: Blumenstraße 7/9 in Düsseldorf (Wehling & Ludwig).
 1903: Construction of a row of small single-family houses in Parkstraße in Düsseldorf, which were to have as many "healthy" rooms as possible at low construction costs (Wehling & Ludwig).
 1903/1904: Villa Bestgen, Theodor-Heuss-Ring 9 in Cologne (Wehling & Ludwig).

1904–1912 (Gottfried Wehling, Düsseldorf) 
Wehling's work as an independent architect and urban planner is documented from 1904 to 1912.
 before 1904: Grabmal für Familie Haniel auf dem Düsseldorfer Nordfriedhof (architect G. Wehling).
 1907: .
 1912: Competition design "for the urban development of the Frankfurter Wiesen in Leipzig" (not awarded a prize).

Illustrations

References

Further reading 
 
 

19th-century German architects
20th-century German architects
Historicist architects
1862 births
1913 deaths
People from Barby, Germany